The Quicksands is a 1914 American short drama film directed by  Christy Cabanne.

Cast
 Courtenay Foote
 Lillian Gish
 Fay Tincher
 Douglas Gerrard
 Mary Alden
 Bob Burns (as Robert Burns)
 F. A. Turner (as Fred A. Turner)

External links

1914 films
1914 short films
American silent short films
1914 drama films
American black-and-white films
Films directed by Christy Cabanne
Silent American drama films
1910s American films